The Wonderful Wizard of Oz (2009) is an eight-issue comic book limited series adapting the L. Frank Baum novel of the same name. The series was written by Eric Shanower with art by Skottie Young and published by Marvel Comics.

Plot summary

When Kansas farm girl Dorothy Gale and her pet dog Toto are swept away to the magical Land of Oz in a cyclone, she fatally flattens the Wicked Witch of the East, liberates a talking Scarecrow, meets a Tin Woodman, a Cowardly Lion and is hailed by everyone as a great sorceress! But all Dorothy really wants to know is: how does she get back home again?

Collected editions
The series has been collected into a single volume:

The Wonderful Wizard of Oz (192 pages, hardcover, September 2009, softcover, March 2010, June 2010)

Reception
The Marvel Oz series has been met with very positive reviews, praising the art, character design and overall layout.

IGN gave the issues of the series an average rating of 9.2 out of 10.

It won the 2010 Eisners for Best Limited Series or Story Arc and Best Publication for Kids.

Sequels
The series has been followed by adaptations of The Marvelous Land of Oz, Ozma of Oz, Dorothy and the Wizard in Oz, Road to Oz, and The Emerald City of Oz by the same creative team. The series did not continue beyond the sixth Oz book.

See also
The Wizard of Oz (comics), for other adaptations

Notes

References

Comics based on Oz (franchise)
Eisner Award winners